Silly (傻) is the debut album released by Taiwanese singer and songwriter  Queen Wei (魏如昀).

Track listing
 傻 (Silly)
 蝶戀 (Butterfly's Love)
 小彩虹 (Small Rainbow)	
 他們 (They)
 Luv Luv Luv
 Party Days
 目光 (Vision)
 親愛的 (Dear)
 擁戴 (Support)
 門沒關 (Door Not Closed)

2008 debut albums
Mandopop albums